Anne Winters is an American poet, leftist, and professor of English at the University of Illinois at Chicago. Having received an early university education at both New York University and Columbia University in New York City, where she was born and raised, she went on to complete her PhD at the University of California, Berkeley. She has studied, in various schools, under the well-known American poets Allen Tate, Randall Jarrell and Robert Lowell. She currently teaches British literature, the Bible (Winters is well-versed in classical Greek, Latin and Hebrew), and graduate courses in translation and poetry.

New York City is the primary subject of her poems. She has won several national awards, most recently the William Carlos Williams Award and Lenore Marshall Poetry Prize for 'The Displaced of Capital.' She was the recipient of a 2006 Guggenheim fellowship, and a 1997 Rona Jaffe Foundation Writers' Award.

Bibliography

Poetry
The Key to the City (1986)
The Displaced of Capital (2004)

Translation
Salamander: Selected Poems of Robert Marteau (1979) (translated from the French)

References

External links
Slate article on Anne Winters
UIC Department of English

Living people
American academics of English literature
New York University alumni
Columbia University alumni
University of California, Berkeley alumni
Year of birth missing (living people)
University of Illinois Chicago faculty
American women poets
Rona Jaffe Foundation Writers' Award winners
American women non-fiction writers
21st-century American women writers
21st-century American poets
20th-century American women writers
20th-century American poets